Airport Road Addition is a census-designated place (CDP) in Brooks County, Texas, United States. The population was 93 at the 2010 census.

Geography
Airport Road Addition is located at  (27.219966, -98.099610).

Demographics
As of the census of 2000, there were 132 people, 42 households, and 39 families residing in the CDP. The population density was 62.5 people per square mile (24.2/km). There were 45 housing units at an average density of 21.3/sq mi (8.2/km). The racial makeup of the CDP was 76.52% White, 0.76% African American, 21.97% from other races, and 0.76% from two or more races. Hispanic or Latino people of any race were 90.15% of the population.

There were 42 households, out of which 45.2% had children under the age of 18 living with them, 81.0% were married couples living together, 9.5% had a female householder with no husband present, and 4.8% were non-families. 4.8% of all households were made up of individuals, and none had someone living alone who was 65 years of age or older. The average household size was 3.14 and the average family size was 3.23.

In the CDP, the population was spread out, with 31.8% under the age of 18, 9.1% from 18 to 24, 25.8% from 25 to 44, 22.0% from 45 to 64, and 11.4% who were 65 years of age or older. The median age was 34 years. For every 100 females, there were 116.4 males. For every 100 females age 18 and over, there were 104.5 males.

The median income for a household in the CDP was $31,250, and the median income for a family was $31,250. Males had a median income of $20,568 versus $6,250 for females. The per capita income for the CDP was $6,256. There were 37.5% of families and 44.7% of the population living below the poverty line, including 64.8% of under eighteens and none of those over 64.

Education
Airport Road Addition is served by the Brooks County Independent School District.

References

Census-designated places in Brooks County, Texas
Census-designated places in Texas